John Raber (March 2, 1823 – August 22, 1902) was a German-American businessman and politician from New York.

Life 
Raber was born on March 2, 1823, in the Kingdom of Prussia. He immigrated to America when he was 10, initially residing in New York City. He moved to Brooklyn in 1841. At one point, he settled in Williamsburg.

Raber initially worked as a clerk in the agricultural business. In 1850, he was engaged in wire cloth and sieve manufacturing. In 1857, he was involved in the flour and feed trade. He was later involved in the grocery business.

In 1866, Raber was elected to the New York State Assembly as a Democrat, representing the Kings County 6th District. He served in the Assembly in 1867. He ran again for the seat that year, but his opponent Jacob Worth was declared the winner. Raber was then awarded and was seated in the Assembly in 1868 on March 13. In 1874, he was appointed charity commissioner.

Raber had three sons and three daughters. One of his sons, Rev. John Raber, was a Roman Catholic priest.

Raber died at home of pneumonia on August 22, 1902. He was buried in Holy Trinity Cemetery.

References

External links 

 The Political Graveyard

1823 births
1902 deaths
Prussian emigrants to the United States
Businesspeople from Brooklyn
Politicians from Brooklyn
People from Williamsburg, Brooklyn
19th-century American businesspeople
19th-century American politicians
Democratic Party members of the New York State Assembly
Deaths from pneumonia in New York City
Burials in New York (state)